Saksenvik is a basic statistical unit in the Nedre Saltdal subarea of the municipality of Saltdal in Nordland county, Norway. European route E6 passes through Saksenvik, part of the way via the Saksenvik Tunnel. Since 2012, the Saksenvik Hydroelectric Power Station has produced electricity in the region.

Quernstone production in Saltdal has been documented since the Middle Ages; in 1432 Aslak Bolt's cadastre recorded a quarry at Setså. Such old written sources do not exist for Saksenvik, and it has been suggested that in earlier times quernstones from Saksenvik were delivered to Setså as a central purchasing and shipping station.

A heritage project is being funded in cooperation between landowners and the municipality of Saltdal, and it has documented quarries for tourists with information boards, signage, and picnic areas.

References

Saltdal